Funso-King Ojo (born 28 August 1991) is a Belgian professional footballer who plays as a midfielder for  club Port Vale.

A Belgium under-21 international, Ojo began his career with Dutch club PSV Eindhoven, making his debut in the Eredivisie in May 2009. He played on loan at VVV-Venlo during the 2010–11 campaign, but was allowed to leave PSV and returned to Belgium to play for Beerschot in June 2012. He joined hometown club Royal Antwerp in August 2013, and signed with Dutch Eerste Divisie side FC Dordrecht in February 2014. He helped Dordrecht to win promotion out of the play-offs at the end of the 2013–14 season, and though the club were relegated the following season, Ojo remained in the Eredivisie after signing with Willem II in June 2015. He spent two seasons with the club, making 60 top-flight appearances, before he moved to England to play for Scunthorpe United in July 2017. He was sold to Scottish Premiership club Aberdeen for a £125,000 fee in July 2019. He spent three seasons with Aberdeen, though spent the second half of the 2020–21 season on loan at Wigan Athletic. He returned to England on a permanent basis after joining Port Vale on a free transfer in June 2022.

Club career

PSV

Ojo joined the PSV Eindhoven Academy from Germinal Beerschot in the 2004–05 season. He made his debut for the first-team at the age of 15, when head coach Ronald Koeman played him in a friendly against amateur side HVCH on 19 May 2007. He was called up by Huub Stevens to the substitute bench for a competitive fixture in the 2008–09 season. He played his first Eredivisie match for PSV on 5 May 2009 against Willem II. He signed a contract extension four months later, which would keep him at the Philips Stadion until summer 2010, after he impressed manager Fred Rutten.

Having featured just twice for PSV in the first half of the 2010–11 season, Ojo joined VVV-Venlo on loan on 8 January 2011. However he struggled to break into the starting eleven under head coach Wil Boessen, much to Ojo and Rutten's frustration. PSV signed Georginio Wijnaldum in June 2011, though Ojo would still manage to make a further ten appearances in the 2011–12 campaign.

Beerschot
On 16 April 2012, Ojo joined Belgian Pro League club Beerschot AC on a free transfer, signing a four-year contract. He had previously come through the youth ranks until departing at the age of twelve. Manager Adrie Koster said that he had gained technical skill in the Netherlands but would need to develop physical attributes to succeed in the Belgian leagues. On 1 September, he scored his first career goal in a 2–0 win at KV Mechelen. However he rarely featured in the second half of the 2012–13 season due to injury and a falling out with new manager Jacky Mathijssen, and became a free agent after the club entered bankruptcy in May 2013; he came close to joining Italian club Chievo, though the deal did not end up being completed. Ojo claimed that Mathijssen "did everything to break me down and blacken me and it worked".

Antwerp
On 29 August 2013, Ojo signed a two-year contract with Belgian Second Division club Royal Antwerp after impressing manager Jimmy Floyd Hasselbaink during a trial spell. He played eight games at the start of the 2013–14 season before being dropped to the reserves, and, in December Hasselbaink confirmed that Ojo was no longer welcome at the Bosuilstadion after being unwilling to play for the youth-team.

Dordrecht
Ojo returned to the Netherlands and joined Eerste Divisie side FC Dordrecht. Dordrecht qualified for the promotion play-offs at the end of the 2013–14 season and Ojo scored one of the goals in a 5–3 aggregate victory over Sparta Rotterdam to secure promotion into the top-flight. He signed a new one-year contract in June 2014. He underwent ankle surgery in February 2015 to remove a piece of floating bone and was ruled out of action for the rest of the 2014–15 season. He had struggled with his ankle injury since the start of the campaign, which would prove to be a poor one for the club as Ernie Brandts's side would go on to be relegated out of the Eredivisie after finishing in last place.

Willem II
Ojo remained in the Eredivisie after signing with Willem II. He became a key first-team player for Jurgen Streppel in the 2015–16 season, playing a total of 38 games. Willem II finished in the relegation play-off places, but would beat both Almere City and NAC Breda to successfully retain their top-flight status. He featured 29 times in the 2016–17 season, though struggled for form during the latter campaign.

Scunthorpe United
On 18 July 2017, Ojo signed a three-year contract with English League One club Scunthorpe United. He quickly became a key player for Graham Alexander's "Iron", forming an excellent midfield partnership with Neal Bishop, and his absence due to injury was blamed for three consecutive defeats in December. He played 47 games across the course of the 2017–18 campaign, scoring two goals, helping United to qualify for the play-offs. He played both legs of the 4–2 aggregate play-off semi-final defeat to Rotherham United. Manager Stuart McCall said that injuries and the team's poor form reduced his effectiveness in the 2018–19 season, and after relegation was confirmed Ojo looked to leave Glanford Park.

Aberdeen
Ojo was linked with a transfer to Scottish club Hibernian in June 2019. Ojo believed that he could leave Scunthorpe on a free transfer after they were relegated to League Two, but the proposed move stalled after Scunthorpe disputed whether Ojo could do this. Later in the summer, Scunthorpe accepted offers of £125,000 from Hibernian and Aberdeen. Ojo moved to Aberdeen, signing a three-year contract with the club. Manager Derek McInnes said that the move was decided for footballing reasons rather than money. He played 16 Scottish Premiership games in the 2019–20 season and also featured four times in the early rounds of the UEFA Europa League. He made seven starts and six substitute appearances in the first half of the 2020–21 campaign. On 28 January 2021, Ojo joined English League One side Wigan Athletic on loan until the end of the 2020–21 season. He made 23 appearances for Leam Richardson's "Latics", helping the club to finish one point above the relegation zone.

In summer 2021, Aberdeen accepted bids from Salford City and Wrexham, though Ojo considered seeing out his contract with Aberdeen and then retiring from the game and returning to Belgium. On 20 November, Ojo was sent off for only the second time in his career after receiving a yellow card for reacting to a Dundee United supporter who pushed him as he went to retrieve the ball from the crowd at Tannadice. The supporter was arrested and later sentenced to community service after admitting assault. Ojo impressed manager Stephen Glass in the first half of the 2021–22 campaign, playing at full-back, attacking midfield, defensive midfield and out wide. However he was not retained by new manager Jim Goodwin and left Pittodrie at the end of his contract in June 2022.

Port Vale
On 28 June 2022, Ojo joined English League One club Port Vale, with director of football David Flitcroft stating that: "we think that Funso is the type of player that can conduct and orchestrate them [his teammates] on the pitch". He started nine of the club's first ten league games of the 2022–23 campaign, before being sidelined with what manager Darrell Clarke described as "quite a bad hamstring" injury at the end of September. He returned to the substitutes bench on Boxing day and scored his first goal at Vale Park on 24 January, in a 2–1 defeat to Derby County. Four days later, he was voted as the club's Player of the Match in a 0–0 draw at Cheltenham Town.

International career
Ojo was capped by Belgium from under-15 to under-21 level, winning his first and only under-21 cap as a late substitute in a Iceland on 1 September 2011.

Style of play
Ojo is a versatile midfielder who links defence and attack by winning the ball and passing it on to more creative teammates. He has good intelligence, fitness and technical ability. Scunthorpe United manager Stuart McCall said that he was best utilised as a defensive midfielder, though can also play as a box-to-box midfielder.

Personal life
Ojo is a trained physical instructor and is also involved in real estate. He entered a not guilty plea to a charge of assault for an incident that took place following a Scottish Premiership match at Tannadice Park in November 2021. Ojo admitted he had "squared-up" to an opposition fan, and was fined £400 after being found guilty of pushing the man and knocking his glasses off, though the punch Ojo had thrown was ruled to have been in self-defence. Speaking in February 2022 as part of the English Football League's 'Green Football Weekend', Ojo was reported to have saved more than 500kg of CO2 emissions from 260 green activities after a change of lifestyle and switch to a plant-based diet.

Career statistics

Honours
Dordrecht
Eerste Divisie play-offs: 2013–14

References

External links
 

1991 births
Living people
Footballers from Antwerp
Belgian footballers
Belgium youth international footballers
Belgium under-21 international footballers
Beerschot A.C. players
PSV Eindhoven players
VVV-Venlo players
Royal Antwerp F.C. players
FC Dordrecht players
Willem II (football club) players
Scunthorpe United F.C. players
Aberdeen F.C. players
Wigan Athletic F.C. players
Port Vale F.C. players
Eredivisie players
Eerste Divisie players
Belgian Pro League players
Challenger Pro League players
English Football League players
Scottish Professional Football League players
Association football midfielders
Black Belgian sportspeople
Belgian people of Nigerian descent
Belgian people of Yoruba descent
Yoruba sportspeople
Belgian expatriate footballers
Expatriate footballers in the Netherlands
Belgian expatriate sportspeople in the Netherlands
Expatriate footballers in England
Belgian expatriate sportspeople in England
Expatriate footballers in Scotland
Belgian expatriate sportspeople in Scotland
People convicted of assault